Melinda M. Snodgrass is a science fiction writer for print and television. In February 2021 Melinda was the Screenwriting Guest of Honor and Keynote Speaker at the 39th annual Life, the Universe, & Everything professional science fiction and fantasy arts symposium.

Life 
Snodgrass lives in Santa Fe, New Mexico. In her spare time she is an equestrian who competes in dressage competition.

Snodgrass holds a degree in History from the University of New Mexico, as well as a law degree from the University of New Mexico School of Law. Her experience as a lawyer informed the Linnet Ellery series she published under the pen name Phillipa Bornikova (This Case Is Gonna Kill Me, 2012; Box Office Poison, 2013; Publish and Perish, 2018, all by Tor Books).

Career 
Snodgrass wrote several episodes of Star Trek: The Next Generation while serving as the series' story editor during its second and third seasons. She has also contributed produced scripts for the series Odyssey 5, The Outer Limits, SeaQuest DSV, and Reasonable Doubts; she was also a consulting producer on The Profiler.

She has also written science fiction novels and short stories, notably the Circuit trilogy and is the co-editor and a frequent story contributor to George R. R. Martin's long-running Wild Cards shared world series.

Snodgrass helped recover a version of the award-winning Star Trek: The Next Generation episode "The Measure of a Man" by saving an old VHS cassette. This allowed a new version to be re-constructed from existing film shots, and an extended cut with 13 minutes of additional footage was released in HD in 2012.

Works

Television

Star Trek: The Next Generation
 "The Measure of a Man" (1989)
 "Pen Pals" (1989)
 "Up the Long Ladder" (1989)
 "The Ensigns of Command" (1989)
 "The High Ground" (1990)

L.A. Law
 "Dances with Sharks" (1991)

Beyond Reality
 "Enemy in Our Midst" (1991)

Reasonable Doubts
 "FAP" (1992)
 "Silence" (1992)
 "Legacy" (1993)
 "The Ties That Bind" (1993)

The Outer Limits
 "The Sandkings" (1995) (from a story by George R. R. Martin)
 "Living Hell" (1995)

Short stories
 Wild Cards series
 "Degradation Rites" (1987) in Wild Cards
 “Relative Difficulties” (1987) in Aces High
 “Mirrors of the Soul” (1988) in Aces Abroad
 “Blood Ties” (1988) in Down and Dirty
 “The Devil's Triangle” in One-Eyed Jacks 
 “Lovers Parts I-VI” (19) in Jokertown Shuffle 
 “Lowball: A Wild Cards Mosaic Novel” (2014)  
 “The Wayfarer’s Advice” (2010) in Songs of Love and Death, anthology edited by George R. R. Martin and Gardner Dozois
"No Mystery, No Miracle" (2011) in Down These Strange Streets, anthology edited by George R. R. Martin and Gardner Dozois
"Written in Dust" (2013) in Old Mars, anthology edited by George R. R. Martin and Gardner Dozois
"The Hands That Are Not There" (2013) in Dangerous Women, anthology edited by George R. R. Martin and Gardner Dozois

Novels
 Star Trek The Tears of the Singers (1984)
 Circuit series
 Circuit (1986)
 Circuit Breaker (1987)
 Final Circuit (1988)
 Queen's Gambit Declined (1989)
 Wild Cards
 Double Solitaire (1992)
 The Edge series
 The Edge of Reason (2008)
 The Edge of Ruin (2010)
 The Edge of Dawn (2015)
 The Imperials Saga
 The High Ground (2016)
 In Evil Times (2017)
 The Hidden World (2018)
 The Currency of War (2019)

Writing as Phillipa Bornikova
 Linnet Ellery series
 This Case Is Gonna Kill Me (2012)
 Box Office Poison (2013)
 Publish and Perish'' (2018)

References

External links 

 
 
 

1951 births
20th-century American novelists
21st-century American novelists
20th-century American short story writers
21st-century American short story writers
20th-century American women writers
21st-century American women writers
American science fiction writers
American women short story writers
American women novelists
Living people
Star Trek: The Next Generation
University of New Mexico alumni
University of New Mexico School of Law alumni
Writers from California
Women science fiction and fantasy writers